Frank Moser (born 23 September 1976) is a German retired professional tennis player. He was a doubles specialist. As a career highlight he beat with partner Ivo Karlović the world's top-ranked doubles team, the Bryan brothers, at the 2011 US Open – Men's doubles. Moser won his only ATP World Tour title in San Jose in 2013.
Currently practises part-time veganism.

ATP career finals

Doubles: 4 (1 title, 3 runner-ups)

ATP Challengers and ITF Futures finals

Singles: 4 (0–4)

Doubles: 60 (25–35)

Doubles performance timeline

Wins over top-10 players

External links
 
 
 

1976 births
Living people
German male tennis players
People from Baden-Baden
Sportspeople from Karlsruhe (region)
Tennis people from Baden-Württemberg